Shaker or Shakers may refer to:

Religious groups
 Shakers, a historically significant Christian sect
 Indian Shakers, a smaller Christian denomination

Objects and instruments
 Shaker (musical instrument), an indirect struck idiophone 
 Cocktail shaker, a device used to mix beverages (usually alcoholic) by shaking
 Shaker (salt and pepper), condiment dispensers designed to allow diners to distribute grains of edible salt and ground peppercorns
 Shaker (laboratory), a device used to stir liquids in chemistry and biology
 Shaker (testing device), a vibration device used in endurance testing or modal testing
 Shaker scoop, an auto component
 Shale shakers, a type of solids control equipment

Music
 Shaker (musical instrument), an indirect struck idiophone 
 Shaker (Lil Shaker), a Ghanaian recording artist, songwriter, producer and performer
 The Shakers (band) a pseudonym for the band Kingsize Taylor and the Dominoes
 Los Shakers, a Uruguayan band
 Shaker (David Johansen album), 2002
 Shaker (Akina Nakamori album)

People with the name 
 Shaker Aamer (born 1966), Saudi citizen held in Guantanamo Bay
 Shaker Ahmed (born 1992), a Bangladeshi cricket player
 Shaker Al-Nabulsi (1940-2014), an American author
 Shaker Asad (born 1979), a Palestinian former soccer midfielder
 Shaker Elsayed (born 1951), the Imam of the Dar Al-Hijrah mosque
 Shaker Ismail (born 1927), an Iraqi former international football player
 Shaker Mahmoud (born 1963), an Iraqi football midfielder
 Shaker Zahra, professor of strategy and entrepreneurship, Carlson School of Management
 Amirhossein Shaker (born 2001)
 Hakeem Shaker (born 1963), a former Iraqi football player and manager
 Hany Shaker (born 1952), an Egyptian singer, actor and composer
 Huda Sajjad Mahmoud Shaker (born 1978), an Iraqi politician
 Jalal Shaker, a former Iraqi football defender
 Mahmoud Shaker (1926-1980), a senior commander in the Egyptian Air Force
 Masihuddin Shaker, Bangladeshi film director and writer
 Mohamed Shaker (1933-2018), an Egyptian diplomat and political scientist
 Mohammed Ali Shaker (born 1997), an Emirati footballer
 Mohammad-Hossein Shaker, an Iranian retired military officer
 Nadhim Shaker (1958-2020), Iraqi football player and coach
 Noor Shaker, a Syrian entrepreneur and computer scientist
 Salam Shaker (born 1986), a former Iraqi professional footballer
 Samir Shaker (born 1958), Iraqi former professional footballer
 Tarek Shaker, an Egyptian politician
 Thamer Shaker (born 1975), a Saudi businessman, management consultant, and writer
 Zaid ibn Shaker (1934-2002), former commander-in-chief of the Jordanian military

Other uses
 Shaker, one of the players executing the shake and bake strategy in the sport pickleball
 Baker University, Baldwin City, Kansas, US
 Shaker (gene), an animal gene
 The Shakers (film), a 1974 documentary film
 Bury F.C. or the Shakers, an English football club
 Shaker (Diagnosis: Murder episode)

See also 
 Shaker furniture, distinctive furniture developed by the Shakers
 Shaker Heights, Ohio, a suburb of Cleveland in the USA
 Shakir (name)
 Chaker (disambiguation)